Carlos Alberto Silva (14 August 1939 – 20 January 2017) was a Brazilian football manager.

Graduate in physical education by Universidade Federal de Minas Gerais, Silva became famous managing Guarani in its 1978 Brazilian Championship title.

Between 1987 and 1988, he managed the Brazil national team.

Honours
Guarani
 Campeonato Brasileiro: 1978

São Paulo
 Campeonato Paulista: 1980, 1989

Atlético Mineiro
 Campeonato Mineiro: 1981
 Tournoi de Paris: 1982

Yomiuri FC
 Japan Soccer League: 1991

Porto
 Portuguese Liga: 1992, 1993
 Portuguese SuperCup: 1991

References

Sources
Enciclopédia do Futebol Brasileiro, Volume 2 – Lance, Rio de Janeiro: Aretê Editorial S/A, 2001.

1939 births
2017 deaths
Brazilian football managers
Brazilian expatriate football managers
1987 Copa América managers
La Liga managers
Primeira Liga managers
Campeonato Brasileiro Série A managers
Expatriate football managers in Spain
Expatriate football managers in Japan
Expatriate football managers in Portugal
Guarani FC managers
São Paulo FC managers
Clube Atlético Mineiro managers
Santa Cruz Futebol Clube managers
Sport Club do Recife managers
Cruzeiro Esporte Clube managers
Brazil national football team managers
Tokyo Verdy managers
FC Porto managers
Sport Club Corinthians Paulista managers
Sociedade Esportiva Palmeiras managers
CR Vasco da Gama managers
Deportivo de La Coruña managers
Goiás Esporte Clube managers
Santos FC managers
C.D. Santa Clara managers
América Futebol Clube (MG) managers
Sportspeople from Minas Gerais